The Deputy Chief Minister of Union Territory of Jammu and Kashmir was a position that existed within the cabinet of Jammu and Kashmir, an Indian state between 1954 and 2019. The state was reconstituted by the government of India as the union territory of Jammu and Kashmir on 31 October 2019.

Deputy Prime & Chief Ministers of Jammu  and Kashmir 

Keys:

See also
 List of Chief Ministers of Jammu and Kashmir
 Government of Jammu and Kashmir

References

Government of Jammu and Kashmir
Deputy chief ministers of Jammu and Kashmir
Jammu and Kashmir